Serdar Özkan (born 1 January 1987) is a Turkish professional footballer who plays as a winger.

Career statistics

References

External links

1987 births
People from Düzce
Living people
Turkish footballers
Turkey youth international footballers
Turkey under-21 international footballers
Turkey international footballers
Association football midfielders
Beşiktaş J.K. footballers
İstanbulspor footballers
Akçaabat Sebatspor footballers
Samsunspor footballers
Galatasaray S.K. footballers
MKE Ankaragücü footballers
Şanlıurfaspor footballers
Elazığspor footballers
Sivasspor footballers
Eskişehirspor footballers
Antalyaspor footballers
Gençlerbirliği S.K. footballers
Bursaspor footballers
Adanaspor footballers
Süper Lig players
TFF First League players